Bethlehem Progressive Baptist Church was a historic church founded for African Americans in Brooksville, Florida. It was built in 1861 at 661 South Brooksville Avenue. Fort Taylor Cemetery served the community. The church's historical site is a stop on the Florida Black Heritage Trail. Bethlehem Baptist Church is now at the site.

See also
Arthur St. Clair (Brooksville, Florida)

References

Churches in Hernando County, Florida
Brooksville, Florida
Churches completed in 1861
1861 establishments in Florida